Beaulieu is a commune in the Haute-Loire department and Auvergne-Rhône-Alpes region of south-east central France.

Population

See also
Communes of the Haute-Loire department

References

External links
 Website of Tir Sportif Beaulieu Emblavez with some photo of Beaulieu : http://www.tsbe.fr

Communes of Haute-Loire